Son of a Critch is a Canadian television comedy series, created by Mark Critch and Tim McAuliffe, that currently airs on CBC Television. It premiered on January 4, 2022. Based on the memoir of the same name by Mark Critch, the semi-autobiographical series follows an adolescent Mark as he grows up in the 1980s in Newfoundland and Labrador.

Premise
The series is a coming of age story based on the childhood and adolescence of Canadian comedian Mark Critch. At the start of the series, 11-year-old Mark is growing up in 1980s Newfoundland, where he navigates starting junior high school, making friends, and connecting with the small collection of people in his limited world.

Cast

Main
 Benjamin Evan Ainsworth as Mark Critch, a semi-fictionalized version of the comedian, entering junior high school at the start of the series
 Mark Critch narrates the series as his adult self
 Mark Critch as Mike Critch, Mark's father and reporter for radio station VOCM
 Claire Rankin as Mary Critch, Mark's mother
 Malcolm McDowell as Patrick “Pop” Critch, Mark's grandfather
 Colton Gobbo as Mike Critch Jr., Mark's older brother
 Sophia Powers as Fox, a female student in the same grade as Mark, who is part of a family of bullies that share the "Fox" nickname
 Mark Rivera as Ritche Perez, Mark's clueless yet slow-witted best friend

Supporting
 Petrina Bromley as Sister Margaret, Mark's homeroom teacher
 Nora McLellan as Sister Rose, the Principal at Mark's school
 Daisy Harris as Tina, a female student in the same grade as Mark
 Richard Clarkin as Dick Dunphy, Mike's coworker at VOCM
 Nicole Underhay as Suzanne, Fox's mother

Development

Conception
In 2018, Critch published a memoir about his childhood in Newfoundland. Following its release, McAuliffe suggested developing the book into a television series, which led to he and Critch creating scripts to pitch to various networks. In June 2021, CBC announced they had ordered Son of a Critch to series.

Production and distribution
The series made its Canadian broadcast premiere on CBC Television on January 4, 2022, as well as CBC's streaming platform, CBC Gem.

Production companies involved with the series include Project 10 Productions, and Take the Shot Productions. Lionsgate will distribute the series outside Canada.

On February 28, 2022, CBC renewed the series for a second season.

Reception
Son of a Critch was watched by an average of 941,000 viewers on its January 4, 2022 Canadian debut, and was the 28th most-watched program in Canada that week.

Episodes

Season 1 (2022)

Season 2 (2023)

References

External links

2022 Canadian television series debuts
2020s Canadian sitcoms
CBC Television original programming
Television shows filmed in St. John's, Newfoundland and Labrador
Television shows set in Newfoundland and Labrador
Television shows based on non-fiction books
Television series about children
Television series set in the 1980s
Television series by Lionsgate Television